The 2015 Pittsburgh Riverhounds season is the club's sixteenth season of existence. It is the Riverhounds' fifth season playing in the USL Professional Division, and the club's third season hosting matches at soccer-specific Highmark Stadium.

Pre-Season Activity 

On December 17, 2014, the club announced the hiring of former Charlotte Eagles manager Mark Steffens as their new head coach.  In the same press conference, it was announced that 2014's interim head coach Nikola Katic was retained as assistant coach, and that Richard Nightingale, formerly of Umbro, would be the team's new president.  It was also announced that the Riverhounds had ended their previous affiliation with MLS's Houston Dynamo.

Competitions

Preseason

USL Pro

U.S. Open Cup

Statistics

Squad information

Transfers

In

Out

References

Pittsburgh Riverhounds SC seasons
Pittsburgh Riverhounds
Pittsburgh Riverhounds